Velma Clancy Dunn (later Ploessel, October 9, 1918 – May 8, 2007) was an American diver who competed in the 1936 Summer Olympics. She was born in Monrovia, California and died in Whittier, California. In 1936 she won the silver medal in the 10 metre platform event.

References

External links
Obituary

1918 births
2007 deaths
American female divers
Divers at the 1936 Summer Olympics
Olympic silver medalists for the United States in diving
Medalists at the 1936 Summer Olympics
20th-century American women
21st-century American women